Spencer Platt may refer to:

 Spencer Platt (photographer) (born 1970), American photographer
 Spencer Platt (cricketer) (born 1974), English cricketer